Rasmus Nordqvist (born 18 July 1975 in Copenhagen) is a Danish politician, who is a member of the Folketing for the Socialist People's Party. He was elected into parliament in the 2015 Danish general election as a member of The Alternative, but changed party to the SPP in 2020.

Political career
Nordqvist was elected into parliament as a member of The Alternative in the 2015 election. He was reelected in 2019, but left the party shortly after - along with Uffe Elbæk, Sikandar Siddique and Susanne Zimmer. The three other former Alternative members went on to found a new party, while Nordqvist instead remained independent for two months before joining the Socialist People's Party.

References

External links
 Biography on the website of the Danish Parliament (Folketinget)

Living people
1975 births
Politicians from Copenhagen
Socialist People's Party (Denmark) politicians
The Alternative (Denmark) politicians
Members of the Folketing 2015–2019
Members of the Folketing 2019–2022